Kundirana is a high-school Music Ministry. Its members are part of a select few students from La Salle Green Hills. Aside from being a known singing group and music ministry, Kundirana also has the distinction of being the most renowned high school singing group in the Philippines.

Composition
The Kundirana is a renowned high school music ministry and organization composed of third and fourth year high school students from La Salle Green Hills. The group is known for developing successful professional singers and musical artists including Gary Valenciano, Ogie Alcasid, Randy Santiago, Monet Silvestre, Rannie Raymundo, Dingdong Avanzado, Dingdong Eduque, Montet Acoymo, Juan Miguel Salvador, Carlo Orosa, Vince Alaras, Von de Guzman and Gian Magdangal of Philippine Idol, Louie Ocampo, Mel Villena, Mon Faustino, Tats Faustino, Rowell Santiago, Manuel Lahoz, Mikoy Morales, Chito Genito, Manny Pagsuyuin (ex-Campus Radio WLS-FM DJ Jimmy Jam now with Retro 105.9 DCG-FM), Joel Salud, Dennis Buenaventura, Dandy Agustin, and Dennis Barot.

The members are carefully picked after rigorous auditions for talented singers. Although the number of students who audition can range from 50 to 70, only about a handful are chosen (depending on the number of graduating members). The final number of selected members for the group usually range from 10 to 16. Once chosen, a Kundirana member undergoes intense training in both singing and dancing eventually becoming ambassadors of goodwill.

Former members
A lot of former members have either continued on to musical careers or have pursued diverse futures. Nevertheless, these former members have proved themselves successful in their paths, and most of them are leaders in their own fields.

A former Kundirana member based in the United States became a doctor and was the one who operated on the US Congresswoman who was shot in the head.

Concerts
Kundirana has a number of concerts per year, including a farewell concert on June. They also perform in several gatherings some of which have included the opening of the NCAA Season 83 in San Juan Arena where they sang the national anthem, and the Inauguration of Noynoy Aquino where they performed a number with Ogie Alcasid and Regine Velasquez.
In August 1987, Kundirana was nationally honored with the Aliw Award as Best Cultural Group in the Philippines.
Just recently, the KUNDIRANA celebrated its 40th anniversary with a grand reunion concert at the CCP entitled "KUNDIRANA KWARENTA NA! The Men, Music and Mission".

Charity work
Kundirana indulges in its public ministry to serve the needy. The ministry aims to bring joy to the sick, the elderly and the forgotten through music. Among their missionary works, Kundirana can claim to have largely built Bahay Pag-asa, a halfway house in Bacolod, Negros Occidental for juvenile delinquents, who in the past were being jailed with adult criminals who would abuse and corrupt them. Kundirana has also built a lot of classrooms in many parts of the country.

Nuestra Señora De Guia

The Patron and Holy Image of Kundirana. The Kundirana is not, and has never been, just an ordinary singing group. In these times of confusion and disillusionment, they are the beacon of inspiration and a sterling example of what is the true substance of all performance, and all art: the upliftment of the human spirit.

These young men accomplish this task not only through their selfless commitment to the service for others that is fueled by an enlightenment behind-the-scenes moral formation which includes a strict code of conduct, ethics and discipline and the molding of a meaningful prayer life.

This task is also accomplish by the group's faith and devotion to Christ and a special relationship with the Blessed Mother. In all of Kundirana's engagements and travels, they are accompanied by the image of the Nuestra Señora De Guia, Our Lady of Guidance, whose home is the Ermita Church.

She is the oldest Marian image in the Philippines, is truly the guide of these young men as she leads their way through the difficult paths to people's hearts. Some, hardened. turned to tender devotion, and others, hungry perhaps for our Lady's succor, rekindled in themselves warm compassion for her.

She was, and is, an important part of the Kundirana's mission. The Lady is there, always leading the Kundirana's way to touch people's hearts, not only through their music, but more importantly, by the example of their faith.

Kundirana 2004: The Instrument
Kundirana 2004 saw the very first ever multimedia concert of the singing group. Held in November 2003 at the AFP Theater, the music ministry then shifted its gears for a massive rebrand led by multi-award-winning musical director Von De Guzman with TV personality Tonipet Gaba as the stage director. Their costumes at that time were designed by renowned designer JC buendia consisting of Suits and trench coats as well as swarovski crystal-embellished baseball shirts. For the first and only time in Kundirana history, they were accompanied by a 40-piece orchestra named as the Kundirana Philharmonic Orchestra for their Maiden Concert. The same orchestra also recorded backing tracks for their numerous concerts around the Philippines and abroad. Along with these, a massive multimedia screen was set up front and center to complement each performance during the concert. During their maiden concert, faculty members and female high school students served as guests in some of their performances. Kundirana 2004 was also able to do several TV guestings and mall shows during the year to promote their maiden concert. The batch recorded their album titled The Instrument and sold copies during their concerts to bolster fund-raising efforts. Amidst all the exposure and travel, the group has kept their consistent contributions to several charitable institutions, most notably to the Bahay Pag-asa youth center in Bacolod.

Kundirana 2004 bid farewell during their farewell concert staged at the Meralco Theater in June 2004 with Gary Valenciano, a Kundirana alumnus himself, as special guest.

In 2008, Kundirana 2004 was invited by LSGH for a reunion concert in celebration of the high school's 50th year celebration called the singkwenta series. It was held at the St. Joseph's Theatre in LSGH with the complete roster of singers performing for the full concert.

Members
Justin Pantaleon (Tenor 1) 
Vincent Lim (Tenor 1) 
Kenneth Rosales (Tenor 1) 
Gilbert Arcilla Jr. (Tenor 2) 
Alessandro Hermoso (Tenor 2) 
Enrique Moran (Tenor 2) 
Samuel de Guzman (Baritone) 
Jose Mari Pedenes (Baritone) 
John Christopher Tolentino (Baritone) 
Paul Joseph Tobillo (Bass) 
Mico Villena (Bass) 
Rafael Casas (Bass) 
Jeron Manzanero (Production Assistant) 
Roy Albert Ressurreccion (Production Assistant)

Kundirana 2012: Change The World

Kundirana 2012 is the 41st batch of the Kundirana Music Ministry. They had their Maiden concert October 2011 and in the following month, joined several alumni in participating in the grand reunion concert of the 40th year of The Kundirana Music Ministry held at the CCP representing the current Kundirana batch.

They are also the first Kundirana batch directed by Mr. Monet Silvestre who is also a Kundirana alumnus. This batch bears the distinction of having brought back the existence of the Kundirana Band which consists of five musicians. They bring the live-music element to each of their performances which in previous years, was absent.

In January 2012, the group had their DLSDasmarinas concert with Mr Gary Valenciano. February 2012, Kundirana 2012 was invited to perform once again in Guam, by Archbishop Anthony Sablan Apuron of the Roman Catholic Archdiocese of Agana. On April 21, 2012, the group held a concert in the city of Davao with Mr. Ogie Alcasid to celebrate a donation to the One La Salle Scholarship Fund by The DLSS - Davao Chapter which was matched by an anonymous donor who witnessed the whole performance by the batch including Mr. Ogie Alcasid. Followed by the Davao concert, the group soon headed to the west coast of USA to do their annual California tour; holding concerts in Carlsbad, San Diego, Diamond Bar, Los Angeles, Chula Vista, San Diego, Murrieta Mesa, Temecula and Sacramento.

They had their Farewell concert on June 28, 2012 at the Bro. Donato Center for the Performing Arts in La Salle Green Hills which was supposed to be their final concert as a batch. Although in July 2012, they were invited once again to perform a final concert in La Salle Ozamis to help raise funds for the typhoon that hit the area.

Members
Milo Magno (Singer) 
Mico Cruz (Singer) 
Harjjii Torio (Singer) 
Levy Cabatingan (Singer)
Jep Pimentel (Singer)
Jamie Calixto (Singer)
Thaddeus Calabia (Singer)
Carlo Clemente (Singer)
Louie Pedroso (Singer)
Luis Gabriel T. Lago (Lead Guitar)
Xyrus Sims (Guitar and Saxophone)
Mizo Banaria (Drums)
Hans Canteras (Bass Guitar)
Joseph Samson (Keyboards)
Jean Garcia (Production Assistant)

Kundirana 2013: For The Love

Kundirana 2013 is the 42nd batch of the Kundirana Music Ministry. They had their Maiden concert October 2012 and in the following month were able to tour around different Lasallian Schools.

Members
Louie Tanaka (Singer) 
Mico Cruz (Singer) 
Steven Maristela (Singer) 
Levy Cabatingan (Singer)
JP Centeno (Singer)
Matthew Ong (Singer)
Gian Inocencio (Singer)
Erickson Amores (Singer)
Louie Pedroso (Singer)
Hans Cantreras (Lead Guitar)
Ralph Murillo (Drums)
Mike Tee (Bass Guitar)
Adrian Goh (Keyboards) 
Jaffe Misa (Production Assistant)

Kundirana 2014: Heart and Soul

Kundirana 2014 is the 43rd batch of the Kundirana Music Ministry. They had their Maiden concert  October 2013 and in the following month were able to tour around different Lasallian Schools. They had the chance to Perform for the Ombudsman of the Philippines, Conchita Carpio Morales. They also had a chance to tour around different Lasallian Schools like University of St. La Salle in Bacolod, Negros Occidental, De La Salle Zobel, De La Salle Medical and Health Sciences Institute and La Salle Academy Iligan City. Kundirana 2014 were also given a chance to perform at Flushing Meadows in Bohol.

Kundirana also had several television appearances, First in ABS-CBN DZMM TeleRadyo, second in Umagang Kay Ganda a famous morning show in the Philippines and third in a Holy Friday Special featuring the music video of Kundirana 2014's original song entitled, "I'll be still, I'll be healed"

The batch was able to record their original song composed by their Musical Director, Monet Silvestre entitled "I'll Be Still, I'll Be Healed". The song is focused on the love of Mary for Christ and for the people.

Last April to May 2014, Kundirana 2014 had a concert tour in USA. The group visited 4 cities in California. They had their first stop in Temecula, then North San Diego, then Chula Vista and last is Sacramento.

Maiden Concert (October 19, 2013) 
Pre Departure Concert (March 29, 2014) 
Farewell Concert (July 19, 2014)

Members
Raven Leonardo (Singer) 
Adrian Goh (Singer) 
Steven Maristela (Singer) 
Brendan Barcena (Singer)
JP Centeno (Singer)
Matthew Ong (Singer)
Eggy Manuel (Singer)
Erickson Amores (Singer)
Jaffe Misa (Singer)
Nico Mercado (Lead Guitar)
Randall Meria (Drums)
Mike tee (Bass Guitar)
JP Ocampo/Monet Silvestre (Keyboards)
Martin Pioquinto (Production Assistant)

Kundirana 2015: Code of Love

Kundirana 2015 is the 44th batch of the La Salle Green Hills’ Kundirana Music Ministry. The group consists of 12 members; 8 singers and 4 band members. Their Maiden concert was held last December 6, 2014 at the Brother Donato Center for the Performing Arts. In the preceding months, the group performed in corporate events and various Lasallian schools such as De La Salle Canlubang, La Salle Academy Iligan, De La Salle Medical and Health Sciences Institute in Dasmarinas, Cavite, in which Kundirana alumnus Mikoy Morales and singing sensation Christian Bautista performed with the group in different concerts.

 The batch will soon be able to record and perform live their new original composed and arranged by their Musical Director, Monet Silvestre, entitled "Do it for Love". The song focuses on all the Kundirana members' love and passion in all of their performances having in mind the idea of making a difference. 

Last  April to May 2015, Kundirana 2015 had a concert tour in the USA. The group visited 3 cities in California; Temecula, Chula Vista, and North San Diego.

Maiden Concert (December 6, 2014)
Pre Departure Concert (April 19, 2014)
Farewell Concert (July 4, 2015)

Members:
Brendan L. Barcena (Singer)
Eggy Manuel (Singer)
Paolo Morales (Singer)
Mikko Quilala (Singer)
Daniel Menilio (Singer)
Baileys Acot (Singer)<br/ >
Leon Matawaran (Singer)
Randall Meria (Drums)
Pancho Revilla (Lead Guitar)
Anton Villa-ignacio (Bass Guitar)
Gelo Morales (Keyboards)
Matthew Angeles (Production Assistant)

Kundirana 2016: Gratitude
Daniel Menil (Singer)
Baileys Acot (Singer)
Milo Uncanin (Singer)
Aj Angeles (Singer)
Miguel Tagle (Singer)
Joaquin Lagman(Singer)
Charles Ongchangco(Drummer)
Anton Villa-Ignacio (Bass Guitar)
Nathan Asuncion( Lead Guitar)
Monet Silvestre (Keyboard)

Maiden Concert (November 14, 2015)

Current Council Members
Monet Silvestre (Musical Director)
Manuel Lahoz (Production Head)
Bro. Richie Yap (Moderator)
Beth Austria (Marketing)

References

Musical groups from Metro Manila